Dovzhky (old name -  (to the 16th century), to year 1945 - .) is a small Carpathian village (selo) in Stryi Raion, Lviv Oblast (province) of Western Ukraine. It belongs to Kozova rural hromada, one of the hromadas of Ukraine. 
The population of the village is about 513 people and Local government is administered by Dovzhkivska village council.

Geography 
The village is located on the slopes of the eponymous of the Mountain Ridge Dovzhky.

History and Attractions 
The first written record of the village dates from 1556. The first name of the village was Malyy Ilnychok, later - Dolske. Only after 1945 the village has been called Dovzhky.

Until 18 July 2020, Dovzhky belonged to Skole Raion. The raion was abolished in July 2020 as part of the administrative reform of Ukraine, which reduced the number of raions of Lviv Oblast to seven. The area of Skole Raion was merged into Stryi Raion.

In the village, there is one architectural monument of local importance of Stryi Raion. It is a wooden Church of the Entry of the Most Holy Mother of God into the Temple (1912) and wooden Belltower.

References

External links 
 weather.in.ua, Dovzhky
 Довжки, Церква Стрітення Господнього 1912

Literature 
 Історія міст і сіл УРСР : Львівська область, Сколівський район, Довжки. – К. : ГРУРЕ, 1968 р. Page 716 

Villages in Stryi Raion